Paul Craig (born 1987) is a Scottish mixed martial artist.

Paul Craig may also refer to:

 Paul Craig (legal scholar) (born 1951), professor of English law
 Paul Craig (runner) (born 1953), Canadian middle-distance runner
 Paul Craig (soccer) (born 1988), Canadian soccer player
 Paul Craig (dancer), American principal ballet dancer